I'm in the Mood Again is the 2009 comeback album by the Irish all-girl pop band The Nolans. Although eight people have been involved in the line up of the band, only four - Coleen, Linda, Maureen and Bernie - returned for this recording. The album consists of many "diva anthems" and also some of The Nolans' greatest hits. It was Bernie's final recording before her death in 2013.

The album peaked at No. 22 on the UK Albums Chart.

Track listing

Lead vocals
 Bernie Nolan: 1, 8, 11-13
 Coleen Nolan: 2, 5, 14, 16
 Maureen Nolan: 6
 Linda Nolan: 9
 Maureen & Linda Nolan: 7

Tour
The Nolans announced in June 2009 that they were reforming for a UK and Ireland tour. Four members - Coleen, Bernie, Linda and Maureen - undertook the tour, in October and November 2009. The two other sisters, Anne and Denise, were not involved.

Controversy
The reunion sparked a split in the family as Anne has appeared in the press stating that she had been excluded from the tour despite being a long-serving member of the group. She also issued a statement on her official website, which included the comment: "they are not my sisters anymore."

Denise also issued a statement in support of Anne, claiming that the real reason for the reunion was due to some of the sisters being in financial difficulty. The other four sisters have said that the decision was made by Universal, who sponsored the tour, due to this being the line-up that enjoyed the most success back in the early 1980s.

References

External links
 

The Nolans albums
2009 albums
Covers albums
Universal Music Group albums